Eutrombicula hirsti, commonly called the scrub-itch mite, is a species of mite in the family Trombiculidae. It is found in northern Australia.

References 

Trombiculidae
Animals described in 1927
Arachnids of Australia